Hematogen (gematogen; ; , aimatogóno) is a nutrition bar which is notable in that one of its main ingredients is black food albumin, a technical term for cow's blood. Other ingredients may vary, but they usually contain sugar, condensed milk and vanillin.

It is often considered to be a medicinal product, and is used to treat or prevent low blood levels of iron and vitamin B12 (e.g., for anemia or during pregnancy).

See also
 Sanguinaccio dolce, a sweet pudding made with pig’s blood
 Protein bar
 Blood as food

References

Dietary supplements
Blood as food
Soviet cuisine
Health in the Soviet Union